Kafr Shoush is a village in northern Aleppo Governorate, northwestern Syria.

The village administratively belongs to Nahiya Sawran in Azaz District. Nearby localities include Kafr Ghan  to the east and Kafr Burayshah  to the west. In the 2004 census, Kafr Shoush had a population of 95.

References

Populated places in Azaz District